Jingpo Lake or Lake Jingpo (Pinyin: Jìng Pō Hú) is a lake located in the upper reaches of the Mudan River among the Wanda Mountains in Ningan County, Heilongjiang Province, in the People's Republic of China.

The winter average temperature in Heilongjiang Province is below -20°C (-4°F), but the temperature at the bottom of the water is always above 10°C (50°F).

On Titan, the largest moon of the planet Saturn, there is a large surface body of liquid hydrocarbons, Jingpo Lacus, named after Jingpo Lake.

Formation 
The lake was created about 10,000 years ago when the lava of volcanic eruptions in the region blocked the flow of the Mudan River. Jingpo Lake has experienced five volcanic eruptions. It is the largest alpine lava barrier lake in China.

Natural resources 
The northern side of the river cascades down the Diaoshuilou Falls, a  waterfall formed by the lake. This lake is famous for its craggy limestone cliffs (similar to those of Guilin) and its turquoise-colored waters containing 40 types of fish and fresh water coral.

In the southern side of the lake, there are river deltas formed in the estuary of Mudan River and its tributaries. This topography supports a large number of plankton to survive, so it is suitable for the growth of fish. There are various kinds of freshwater fish in Jingpo Lake. The most famous one is Red-tailed fish, also known as White Cloud Mountain minnow (Tanichthys albonubes). 

The lava stone also provides a good environment for rice to grow due to its ability to absorb heat.

Cultural landscapes 
Jingpo Lake is on the first list of National Park of China. It was approved as a National Geopark of China In August 2005.

On September 18, 2006, Jingpo Lake was designated as one of the Global Geoparks by UNESCO.

Gallery

See also
 List of volcanoes in China

References

External links
 Brief Introduction of China's Major Lakes 
Jingpo Lake: More Than Natural Scenery with photos

Jingpo
Bodies of water of Heilongjiang
Volcanoes of China
Geography of Heilongjiang
Tourist attractions in Heilongjiang
Global Geoparks Network members
Geoparks in China
Landforms of Heilongjiang
Parks in Heilongjiang
Lava dammed lakes